Swahili Times is a Tanzanian online news aggregator and blog that features mostly local and international news, both in Swahili. It was launched on April 2, 2016. The site offers news, satire, blogs, and covers politics, business, entertainment, environment, technology, popular media, lifestyle, culture, comedy, gossip, life around Tanzanian's new generation of movies and music lifestyle and local news, based in Dar es Salaam. It also runs the most active Twitter news handle in Tanzania.

References

External links

Tanzanian news websites
Mass media in Tanzania
News websites